This is a list of notable civil servants of the Republic of Turkey.

Living

Jurists

Politicians and diplomats

Others

Deceased

See also
List of Turkish people

 
List of civil servants
Civil servants
Turkey